Hayden House may refer to:

in the United States
(by state then town)
C.T. Hayden House, Tempe, Arizona, listed on the National Register of Historic Places (NRHP) in Maricopa County
Terry-Hayden House, Bristol, Connecticut, listed on the NRHP in Hartford County
Gilman-Hayden House, East Hartford, Connecticut, listed on the NRHP in Hartford County
Capt. Nathaniel Hayden House, Windsor, Connecticut, listed on the NRHP in Hartford County
Hayden Depot, Hayden, Colorado, listed on the NRHP in Routt County
Hayden Rooming House, Hayden, Colorado, listed on the NRHP in Routt County
Hayden Ranch Headquarters, Leadville, Colorado, listed on the NRHP in Lake County
Isaac R. Hayden House, Lewisport, Kentucky, listed on the NRHP in Hancock County
Hayden Building, Boston, Massachusetts, listed on the NRHP in Suffolk County
Lewis and Harriet Hayden House, a historic Abolitionist-associated house in Beacon Hill, Boston
William Hayden House (Tecumseh, Michigan), listed on the NRHP in Lenawee County
A. W. Hayden House, Albuquerque, New Mexico, listed on the NRHP in Bernalillo County
Hayden House (Ossining, New York), a children's home that is a Roman Catholic Archdiocese of New York charity
Potton-Hayden House, Big Spring, Texas, listed on the NRHP in Howard County
William Hayden House (Albany, Vermont), listed on the NRHP in Orleans County

See also
William Hayden House (disambiguation)